The 2001 Michigan Wolverines football team represented the University of Michigan in the 2001 NCAA Division I-A football season.  The team's head coach was Lloyd Carr.  The Wolverines played their home games at Michigan Stadium.

Schedule

Roster

Statistical achievements
On October 27, Larry Foote earned a share of the single-game conference record of 7 tackles for a loss, becoming the third conference athlete to do so.  He also holds a share of the national record, becoming the third player to do so since the NCAA recognized it as a stat.

Marquise Walker was the Big Ten receiving statistical champion with 7.5 receptions per conference game and 7.2 reception per game. On September 8 against Washington and November 24 against Ohio State he posted 15 receptions breaking the record of 12 set in 1958 by Brad Myers and tied in 1996 by Tai Streets.  The record still stands.  During the season, he set the school record for single-season receptions (86), surpassing Jack Clancy's 1966 record of 76; career receptions (176), surpassing Anthony Carter's 161 set in 1982; consecutive games with a reception (32), surpassing Mercury Hayes's 30 set in 1995; and single-season reception yards, surpassing David Terrell's record set the prior season. Braylon Edwards surpassed all of these records in 2004.

The team earned the Big Ten rushing defense statistical championships for all games by holding opponents to 89.1 yards per game.  The team also earned the Big Ten rushing defense statistical championships for conference games by holding opponents to 95.4 yards per game.  The team earned the Big Ten passing defense statistical championships for conference games by holding conference opponents to 190.8 yards per game, although Ohio State won the title for all games. They also ranked first in passing efficiency defense for both conference games (103.5) and with Ohio State leading for all games.  The team led the conference in total defense for conference games (286.1) and all games (316.4).  The team led the Big Ten Conference in scoring defense for conference games (16.9 points per game) and all games (19.8).  They were the conference leaders in quarterback sacks for conference games (4.4 sacks per game) and all games (4.2 sacks per game).

John Navarre set the school single-season pass attempts record of 385, surpassing 350 by Tom Brady in 1998.  He would rebreak his own record in each of the next two seasons.

Awards and honors
Co-captain: Eric Brackins, Shawn Thompson
All-Americans: Larry Foote, Marquise Walker
All-Conference: Larry Foote, Jonathan Goodwin, Dan Rumishek, Marquise Walker
Most Valuable Player: Marquise Walker
Meyer Morton Award: Bill Seymour
John Maulbetsch Award: Chris Perry
Frederick Matthei Award: Ronald Bellamy
Dick Katcher Award: Shantee Orr
Arthur Robinson Scholarship Award: Jake Frysinger
Hugh Rader Jr. Award: Kurt Anderson
Robert P. Ufer Award: Eric Brackins
Roger Zatkoff Award: Larry Foote

Coaching staff
Head coach: Lloyd Carr
Assistant coaches: Teryl Austin, Erik Campbell, Jim Herrmann, Brady Hoke, Fred Jackson, Terry Malone, Andy Moeller, Bobby Morrison, Stan Parrish
Staff: Scott Draper, Mark Ouimet, Kelly Cox
Trainer: Paul Schmidt
Managers: Nate Bentz, Joe Harper, Craig Hisey, Brad Hoffman, Chris Lemaster, Adam Jahnke, Matt Kernen, Maggie Malone, Katie McNall, Craig Podolski, Rick Polanco, Brian Resutek, Victor Soto, Davon Wilson

Game summaries

Miami (OH)

Washington

Western Michigan

Illinois

Penn State

Purdue

Iowa

Michigan State

Minnesota

Wisconsin

Ohio State

Citrus Bowl: Tennessee

References

External links
  2001 Football Team -- Bentley Historical Library, University of Michigan Athletics History
 2001 Michigan at NCAA.org

Michigan
Michigan Wolverines football seasons
Michigan Wolverines football